So's Your Uncle is  1943 comedy film directed by Jean Yarbrough and starring Billie Burke and Donald Woods. The screenplay concerns a man who impersonates his uncle and runs into trouble with his girlfriend's aunt.

Cast
 Billie Burke as Aunt Minerva
 Donald Woods as Steve Curtis aka Uncle John
 Elyse Knox as Patricia Williams
 Frank Jenks as Joe Elliott
 Robert Lowery as Roger Bright
 Irving Bacon as Dempster
 Chester Clute as Dinwiddle
 Paul Stanton as John L, Curtis
 Jack Norton as Drunk
 Tom Kennedy as Cop
 John Dilson as Stevens

Lawsuit
The film was part of a lawsuit by Harold Lloyd against Universal Pictures. He claims they copied sequences from his films, The Freshman, Movie Crazy and Welcome Danger in their films Her Lucky Night, So's Your Uncle and Lucky Man. The court awarded Lloyd $60,000 for Movie Crazy being infringed by So's Your Uncle. He settled with Universal for more than $100,000 for the other two films.

References

External links

1943 films
American comedy films
1943 comedy films
American black-and-white films
Films directed by Jean Yarbrough
1940s American films